Itahari is a sub-metropolitan city in the Sunsari District of Province No. 1 of Nepal. Itahari city is business hub of eastern Nepal. It is the second most populous city in Eastern Nepal after Biratnagar. Situated at a distance of 25 kilometres north of the provincial capital of Biratnagar, 16 kilometres south of Dharan and 92 kilometres west of Kakarbhitta, Itahari serves as a junction point of the east-west Mahendra highway and the north–south Koshi highway. Itahari has an estimated city population of 1,98,098 living in 40,207 households as per 2021 Nepal census. It is one of the fastest growing cities of Eastern Nepal. It is one of the cities of the Greater Birat Development Area which incorporates the cities of Biratnagar-Itahari-Gothgau-Biratchowk-Dharan primarily located on the Koshi Highway in Eastern Nepal, with an estimated total urban agglomerated population of 804,300 people living in 159,332 households.

The town is divided into a total of 20 wards. The municipality was established in 1997 and became a sub-metro in 2014 after merging the VDCs of Khanar, Ekamba, Pakali and Hansposa.

Transportation
Itahari is a fast-growing town in eastern Nepal. .It is situated in a fertile plain. Located at the main transportation junction in eastern Nepal, the town is gaining importance as a traffic hub. Being at the junction of the Mahendra Highway and the Koshi Highway, the town is of emerging importance.
means of transportation.

Biratnagar Airport is the nearest airport which is situated at 23 km distance from Itahari. Itahari is the junction of eastern development region.

Weather
In the winter season, the temperature of Itahari is 10–18 ℃, it increases to 30–42 ℃ during the summer season. About 2007 mm of precipitation falls annually. There is 4 mm of precipitation in December. In July, the precipitation reaches its peak, with an average of 571 mm.

Education
 Itahari International College
 Godawari Vidhya Mandir 
Koshi St. James Sec. School & College
Vishwa Adarsha College and School.
Sushma Secondary School

Demographics

Languages 

At the time of the 2011 Census of Nepal, 52% of the population in the City spoke Nepali, 19% Tharu, 8% Maithili, 3% Rai, 2% Urdu, 2% Limbu, and 13% spoke other languages as their first language.

Ethnic groups 

The largest ethnic group is Tharu, who makes 19% of the population,  Hill Brahman and Chhetri comes to second and third with 17% each. Other groups in itahari includes the Rai (8%), Newar (4%), Muslim (3%) and others various ethnic gropups makes(31%) of the population.

Local Level Election

Local Level Election 2079

Notable people
 Ritesh Thapa, a national level football player

References

External links

 
Populated places in Sunsari District
Municipalities in Koshi Province
Nepal municipalities established in 1997
Submetropolitan municipalities of Nepal
Municipalities in Sunsari District